The internal pudendal artery is one of the three pudendal arteries. It branches off the internal iliac artery, and provides blood to the external genitalia.

Structure 
The internal pudendal artery is the terminal branch of the anterior trunk of the internal iliac artery. It is smaller in the female than in the male.

Path
It arises from the anterior division of internal iliac artery. It runs on the lateral pelvic wall. It exits the pelvic cavity through the greater sciatic foramen, inferior to the piriformis muscle, to enter the gluteal region.

It then curves around the sacrospinous ligament to enter the perineum through the lesser sciatic foramen.

It travels through the pudendal canal with the internal pudendal veins and the pudendal nerve.

Branches
The internal pudendal artery gives off the following branches:
 

The deep artery of clitoris is a branch of the internal pudendal artery and supplies the clitoral crura. Another branch of the internal pudendal artery is the dorsal artery of clitoris.

Some sources consider the urethral artery a direct branch of the internal pudendal artery, while others consider it a branch of the perineal artery.

In males, the internal pudendal artery also gives rise to the perforating arteries of the penis.

Variation 
Around 70% of men have an accessory internal pudendal artery. This usually does not originate from the internal iliac artery, instead originating from the external iliac artery, the obturator artery, or the vesical arteries.

Function 
The internal pudendal artery supplies blood to the external genitalia.

Clinical significance 
In women, the internal pudendal artery may be damaged during childbirth. This may cause a haematoma, which usually resolves without treatment, but may form an infected abscess.

Additional images

See also
 Pudendal nerve
 Superficial external pudendal artery
 Deep external pudendal artery

References

External links
  - "Inferior view of female perineum, branches of the internal pudendal artery."
  - "Inferior view of female perineum, branches of the internal pudendal artery."
  - "Branches of internal pudendal artery in the male perineum."
  - "Sagittal view of the internal iliac artery and its branches in the female pelvis. "
  - "Sagittal view of the internal iliac artery and its branches in the male pelvis. "
 
 
 
 
 
 Diagram at MSU

Arteries of the abdomen